"Stamp Your Feet" is a song by American singer Donna Summer. It was released on April 15, 2008 by Sony Burgundy as the second single from her 2008 album Crayons. The song was written by Summer, Danielle Brisebois, and Greg Kurstin, who also produced the track.

American Idol performance
Summer performed "Stamp Your Feet" on the Season 7 finale of American Idol. Summer performed the single along with the six female finalists of the series as background singers.

Official Mixes
DiscoTech Remix – 5:37
Escape & Coluccio Club Mix – 8:26
Escape & Coluccio Radio Edit – 3:51
Granite & Sugarman Remix – 8:11
Granite & Sugarman Mixshow - 5:15
Jason Nevins Extended Mix – 7:08
Jason Nevins Radio Mix – 3:45
Ranny's Big Room Mix – 7:26
Ranny's Radio – 3:58
Ranny's Mixshow - 5:42*
Jason Nevins Mixshow - 5:28*
Escape & Coluccio Mixshow - 5:28*
DiscoTech Mixshow Edit - 4:25*

* - private mixes

Chart performance
"Stamp Your Feet" became Summer's 14th number-one entry overall on Billboard'''s Hot Dance Club Play chart. She also scored her first back-to-back number-one singles on this chart since 1999.

In popular culture
 In 2018, the song was included in the Broadway musical Summer: The Donna Summer Musical''.

References

Donna Summer songs
2008 singles
Songs written by Donna Summer
Songs written by Danielle Brisebois
Songs written by Greg Kurstin
Song recordings produced by Greg Kurstin
2008 songs
House music songs
Dance-pop songs
Sony Music singles